Enon is an unincorporated community in Caldwell County, Kentucky, United States. It was also known as Walnut Grove.

References

Unincorporated communities in Caldwell County, Kentucky
Unincorporated communities in Kentucky